The Association of Transylvanian Saxons in Germany is a German organisation formed in 1946 by those who were resettled in Germany from Transylvania. Its goals are the integration of Transylvanian Saxons in Germany and the preservation and promotion of Transylvanian Saxon culture. It is based in Munich, Bavaria, and has over 25,000 members. It was renamed from the "Landsmannschaft der Siebenbürger Sachsen in Deutschland" in 2007.

See also 

 Deutsch-Baltische Gesellschaft
 Society of Germans from Hungary
 Sudetendeutsche Landsmannschaft

External links 
 Verband der Siebenbürger Sachsen in Deutschland  

Transylvanian Saxon people
Landsmannschaften
1946 establishments in Germany
Organizations established in 1946